is a railway station in Tagawa, Fukuoka Prefecture, Japan. It is on the Itoda Line, operated by the Heisei Chikuhō Railway. Trains arrive roughly every hour.

Station layout
The station consists of a single side platform serving a single track. A shelter is located at the center of the platform. Entry to the station consists of ramps that connect to a parallel road east of the station. The station is unmanned.

History
The station opened on 1 October 1990.

On 1 April 2009, discount shop chain MrMax acquired naming rights to the station.

References

Railway stations in Fukuoka Prefecture
Railway stations in Japan opened in 1990
Heisei Chikuhō Railway Itoda Line